Sergio Goity (21 February 1930 – 23 April 1980) was a Chilean footballer. He played in three matches for the Chile national football team in 1956. He was also part of Chile's squad for the 1956 South American Championship.

References

External links
 
 

1930 births
1980 deaths
Chilean footballers
Chile international footballers
Place of birth missing
Association football defenders
Club Deportivo Palestino footballers